Beautiful Door is the fourth (and most recent) album by American actor and singer-songwriter Billy Bob Thornton. It was released by New Door Records in 2007.

Track listing

Personnel

Musicians
 Teddy Andreadis - Accordion, Main Personnel, Organ, Piano
 J.D. Andrew - Audio Engineer, Engineer, Main Personnel, Shaker
 Brad Davis - Audio Engineer, Audio Production, Composer, Guitar (Acoustic), Main Personnel
 Graham Nash - Guest Artist, Main Personnel, Vocals (Background)
 Leland Sklar - Bass, Main Personnel
 Billy Bob Thornton - Audio Production, Composer, Drums, Main Personnel, Primary Artist, Producer, Shaker, Tambourine, Vocals, Vocals (Background)

Production
 Adam Day - Guitar Technician
 Mike Fasano - Drum Technician
 Richie Gallo - A&R
 Joe Gastwirt - Mastering
 Jim Mitchell - Audio Engineer, Audio Production, Engineer, Mixing, Producer
 Meire Murakami - Design
 Ryan Null - Photo Courtesy
 Lisa Roy - Management
 Kristin Scott - Production Coordination
 Beth Stempel - Production Coordination
 Steve Winstead - Guitar Technician

References

2007 albums
Billy Bob Thornton albums